Butterworth is an extinct town in Warren County, Ohio. 

A variant name was "Butterworth Station". The community was named after Benjamin Butterworth, the original owner of the site.

It was located in Hamilton Township, west of Butterworth Road along the Little Miami River.

References

Ghost towns in Ohio
Landforms of Warren County, Ohio